Northwest Plano Park & Ride is a new bus-only station located on Communications Parkway in Plano, Texas (U.S.A.). Owned and operated by Dallas Area Rapid Transit (DART), this new Park & Ride station brings improved bus service to the Legacy area. It is one of the few DART transit centers outside the Dallas County area. The new facility will be accessible from downtown Dallas by express bus service during rush hours and the extension of a local route during the midday Monday through Friday. Additional routes will serve local shopping and employment destinations in the Legacy and Granite Park areas, and connections will be available to both Parker Road Station and Jack Hatchell Transit Center. DART's new paid parking program (named "Fair Share"), will also be in operation.

References

External links
Dallas Area Rapid Transit - Northwest Plano Park & Ride

Dallas Area Rapid Transit
2012 establishments in Texas
Bus stations in Texas